Pompignan is the name or part of the name of several communes in France:

 Pompignan, in the Gard department
 Pompignan, in the Tarn-et-Garonne department